The 1962–63 South-West Indian Ocean cyclone season was an average cyclone season, although it began early with the first October storm since 1911. Two storms formed in December, both of them passing near the Mascarene Islands.

Systems

Moderate Tropical Storm Amy

Toward the beginning of October, an area of low pressure persisted near Diego Garcia, while a strong anticyclone stretched from Madagascar to Île Amsterdam. On October 9, Diego Garcia reported westerly winds and falling pressure, indicating that a tropical cyclone developed that day. This marked the first October tropical storm formation in the basin since 1911. Given the name Amy, the storm moved to the west-southwest, tracked by Television Infrared Observation Satellite (TIROS). Passing north of Rodrigues island, the storm's track shifted more westerly as the anticyclone to the south strengthened. Amy later weakened as it approached the east coast of Madagascar, dissipating on October 17.

Amy produced hailstones on Rodrigues while passing nearby, and brushed St. Brandon with gusty winds. The storm also dropped heavy rainfall and produced moderate waves on Réunion.

Tropical Cyclone Bertha

At the end of November, an area of low pressure persisted near Diego Garcia, associated with the Intertropical Convergence Zone (ITCZ). A circulation developed southwest of the island on November 29, which moved generally to the southwest due to an anticyclone to the south. On December 1, the low pressure area was confirmed to have developed into Tropical Storm Bertha while near the Mascarene Islands. The storm turned to the south, after a polar low weakened the ridge to the south. Bertha passed between Rodrigues and Réunion on December 3, producing only above normal seas. At its peak, the storm reached tropical cyclone status, or peak winds of at least . The storm became extratropical the next day, and was last noted on December 6.

Severe Tropical Storm Cecile

As early as December 18, an area of low pressure persisted near Diego Garcia. By December 24, falling pressures and increasing winds indicated that Tropical Storm Cecile had developed near St. Brandon. At its peak, the storm reached tropical cyclone status, or peak winds of at least . The storm tracked southward, passing between Mauritius and Rodrigues while weakening. Cecile turned more to the south-southeast in tandem with a large anticyclone moving eastward. The storm was last noted on December 28, having become extratropical that day.

Tropical Cyclone Delia

Delia originated near Diego Garcia and moved southwestward, passing north of St. Brandon, east of Madagascar, and west of Réunion. It lasted from January 12 to January 20.

Severe Tropical Storm Emma

According to the MFR, Emma was a short-lived tropical storm that persisted southeast of Rodrigues, although other warning agencies tracked it for much longer, following it from the Australian basin for 12 days.

Severe Tropical Storm Fanny

Fanny developed northeast of St. Brandon and moved to the west-southwest, crossing Madagascar before dissipating on February 19.

Tropical Cyclone Grace

On February 12, Tropical Storm Grace was moving west-southwestward away from Diego Garcia. It later turned to the south-southeast, passing west of Rodrigues, dissipating on February 22.

Moderate Tropical Storm Hilda

Tropical Storm Hilda was a short-lived storm that originated in the Mozambique Channel and moved south-southeastward, lasting from February 27 to March 2.

Moderate Tropical Storm Irene

Tropical Storm Irene was a westward moving storm that originated on March 3, passed north of Tromelin Island, and dissipated on March 5 northeast of the north coast of Madagascar.

Tropical Cyclone Julie

The final storm of the season, Julie formed on March 4 to the southwest of Diego Garcia. It moved southwestward and later turned to the south-southeast, passing east of Rodrigues, before dissipating on March 11.

See also

 Atlantic hurricane seasons: 1962, 1963
 Eastern Pacific hurricane seasons: 1962, 1963
 Western Pacific typhoon seasons: 1962, 1963
 North Indian Ocean cyclone seasons: 1962, 1963

References

South-West Indian Ocean cyclone seasons